Sungai Jawi, commonly known as Jawi is the district seat of South Seberang Perai District, Penang, Malaysia. It is located in the middle of the district and beside the North-South Expressway.

Transportation

Car
North–South Expressway Northern Route, 156 serves Sungai Jawi.

References 

Populated places in Penang
South Seberang Perai District